Haddam Island State Park is an undeveloped  island in the lower Connecticut River in the town of Haddam, Connecticut, in the United States. Originally used by the Wangunk tribe, the island was reserved for their use as part of a  land sale to English colonists in May 1662. In the 19th century, the island was used for fishing and farming. The early 20th century saw it as a place of public recreation, and the State of Connecticut purchased the island and made it a state park in 1944. The park is only accessible by boat, and recommended activities are boating, fishing, and birdwatching.

History
The original English settlement in the area was called Thirty Mile Island Plantation. However, the natives reserved the right to use the island as part of the sale stipulations. Though little documentation exists today, the Wangunk tribe lived on the island and in the surrounding area before selling it along with the rest of their land. Recorded deeds show that the Wangunk tribe made another land sale in 1672, and the remaining parcels of Wangunk land were sold between 1765 and 1769.

At the close of the 18th century, the island was one of the most important fishing locations on the Connecticut River. In the 19th century, two fishing companies operated from the island and constructed piers, and the island was also used for grazing cattle and farming corn. Records in the late 19th century indicate that the Haddam Island area of the Connecticut River was dredged annually. The island became a popular recreational area with picnics and private events in the beginning of the 20th century. The island was purchased by the State of Connecticut in 1944, and it became a state park. According to legend, Captain Kidd buried some of his treasure on the island, but none has been found.

Activities
Haddam Island State Park is home to a large number of bird species, especially during annual migrations, which make it suitable for birdwatching. Bird-banding and other research activities have taken place on the island. Other recommended activities are boating and fishing. Access via boat is available from the Haddam Meadows State Park boat launch, a half mile south of Haddam Island. The northern side of the island has a beach that is fragile and cannot support heavy visitation, and the island has a significant amount of poison ivy.

References

External links
Haddam Island State Park, Connecticut Department of Energy and Environmental Protection
Photo of the island in 1877 in Haddam, 1870-1930

State parks of Connecticut
Parks in Middlesex County, Connecticut
Protected areas established in 1944
1944 establishments in Connecticut
Connecticut River
River islands of Connecticut
Haddam, Connecticut